The Clostridiales-1 RNA motif is a conserved RNA structure identified by bioinformatics.  It is a four-stem structure common in bacteria that inhabit the human gut and is also found in a variety of bacteria classified within the order Clostridiales.  Its function is unknown.

References

External links
 

Non-coding RNA